Chandrabindoo (often spelled Chandrabindu), based in Kolkata, is a Bengali band known for satirical, colloquial lyrics, with references to current affairs and cultural phenomena.

The band is chiefly popular in the Indian city of Kolkata, and in cities like Delhi and Mumbai that have a large expatriate Bengali population.

Name Origin
The band shares its name with the last letter (technically a modifier) of the Bengali alphabet, ◌̐. The name is a reference to a piece of dialogue from Sukumar Ray's হযবরল HaJaBaRaLa, a well-known work of literary nonsense in Bengali.

বেড়াল বলল, “বেড়ালও বলতে পার, রুমালও বলতে পার, চন্দ্রবিন্দুও বলতে পার।” আমি বললাম, “চন্দ্রবিন্দু কেন?”

শুনে বেড়ালটা “তাও জানো না?” বলে এক চোখ বুজে ফ্যাচ্‌ফ্যাচ্ করে বিশ্রীরকম হাসতে লাগল। আমি ভারি অপ্রস্তুত হয়ে গেলাম। মনে হল, ঐ চন্দ্রবিন্দুর কথাটা নিশ্চয় আমার বোঝা উচিত ছিল। তাই থতমত খেয়ে তাড়াতাড়ি বলে ফেললাম, “ও হ্যাঁ-হ্যাঁ, বুঝতে পেরেছি।”

বেড়ালটা খুশি হয়ে বলল, “হ্যাঁ, এ তো বোঝাই যাচ্ছে— চন্দ্রবিন্দুর চ, বেড়ালের তালব্য শ, রুমালের মা— হল চশমা। কেমন, হল তো?”

The cat said "You can call me a cat, or a handkerchief, or even a chandrabindoo". "Why a chandrabindoo?" I asked.

"Can't you tell?" said the cat, winking and sniggering in a most irritating way. I was taken aback. Perhaps I ought to have known about the chandrabindoo, I thought. "Ah!" I said quickly. "I understand".

"Of course you do,"said the Cat, pleased. "‘cha’ for chandrabindoo, ‘sha’ for birāl (cat), and ‘mā’ for rumāl (handkerchief) - that spells ‘chashma’(spectacles) Simple, isn't it?"

Early days
 
The band faced many problems during the production of their first album Aar Jani Na, having to produce their demo with the help of an out-of-date sound mixer. It was released in 1998, and got a lukewarm response. However, they came to the attention of Gautam Chattopadhyay of Mohiner Ghoraguli, and he recommended them to Asha Audio, who released their second album Gadha. The first public live show of Chandrabindoo was held in Gyan Manch near Rabindra Sadan, Kolkata.

Band members 
 Upal Sengupta – singer/ music composer/ lead vocal
 Anindya Chatterjee – singer/ music composer/ lead vocal
 Chandril Bhattacharya – lyricist/music composer/ vocal
 Arup Podder – bassist
 Surojit Mukherjee – guitarist/ arranger
 Rajshekhar Kundu – drummer
 Sibabrata Biswas aka Sibu – keyboardist
 Sourabh – percussionist
and Tirthankar as sound engineer.

Former members 
Chandrabindoo's former members include Subrato Lodh, Subrato Ghosh, Sukhendu, Subhendu, Debapriyo, Tennie, Lintu, Santanu, Arindam, Pritam, Dron Acharya, Riju, Kallol, Rajesh, Riddhi, Chandan, Papa, Jisshu Sengupta, Neepabeethi Ghosh, Lopamudra Mitra.

Discography 

Studio Albums

 Aar Jani Na (Lit: Don't Know Any More) (1997), T-Series
 Gadha (Lit: Donkey) (1998), Asha Audio
 Twaker Jatna Nin (Lit: Take Care Of Your Skin) (1999), Asha Audio
 Chaw (Lit: Let's Go) (2001), Asha Audio
 Daknam (Lit: Nickname) (2002), Sony BMG
 Juju (Lit: The Bugbear) (2003), Sony Music
 Hulabila (Lit: Hullabaloo) (2005), Sagarika
 U/A (Lit: U/A) (2008), BIG Music
 Noy (Lit: Nine) (2012), Kaleidoscope

Compilation Albums

 Chandrabindaas (Lit: Chandrabindoo is Bindaas) (2005)
 Ebhabeo Phire Asha Jae (Lit: Even that's a Comeback) (2005)
Bachhai 11 (Lit: Selected 11) (2006)
Sera Chandrabindoo (Lit: Best Of Chandrabindoo) (2008)

Filmography

Other work 
They made their first international tour in July 2015, when they performed in London in aid of the Kolkata-based Child In Need Institute (CINI). Chandrabindoo is the official brand ambassador for CINI ASHA.

See also 
 Moheener Ghoraguli
 Music of West Bengal

References

External links 
chandrabindoo.in (official website of Chandrabindoo)
twitter.com/chandrabindaas (Official Twitter page)
youtube.com/user/chandrabindooband (Official YouTube channel)
Singing the nonsense verse, a Times of India article on the band
, an article on the band in The Hindu
Chandrabindoo answers FAQs, an interview of Chandrabindoo by Anurag Basu in his talk show Ke Hobe Biggest Fan on Zee Bangla
Listen to all Chandrabindoo Songs
Chandrabindoo to perform in aid of the Child In Need Institute an article on CINI UK website
Chandrabindoo's new music video featuring Vidya Balan named Jani Na from the forthcoming album E-arki

Bengali musical groups
Culture of Kolkata
Bengali musicians
Musical groups established in 1998